Eqbaliyeh (formerly, Soltanabad-e Eqbaliyeh (also Romanized as Solţānābād-e Eqbālīyeh, or simply Solţānābād or Sultanabad) is a city in the Central District of Qazvin County, Qazvin Province, Iran. At the 2016 census its population was 55,066, in 16,154 families.

References 

Qazvin County
Cities in Qazvin Province